Mezhdurechensky is a rural locality (a settlement) in Mezhdurechenskoye Rural Settlement of Pinezhsky District, Arkhangelsk Oblast, Russia. The population was 1,981 as of 2010. There are 12 streets.

Geography 
Mezhdurechensky is located 7 km north of Karpogory (the district's administrative centre) by road. Soga is the nearest rural locality.

References 

Rural localities in Pinezhsky District